Puig-reig is a municipality and town in the comarca of Berguedà, Catalonia. As of 2009, the town had a population of 4,403.

Atop a hill overlooking the Llobregat River, its name means 'royal hill' in old Catalan. The town includes two medieval fortresses, as well as numerous examples of Romanesque and Gothic architecture. Industrial and vernacular architecture can also be found in the numerous industrial colonies and masies, or farm houses, within the limits of the municipality.

They are also home to La Polifònica de Puig-reig.

History
The existence of the town of Puig-reig is first documented in 907, at the consecration of St Martin's Church.

Main sights

The Puig-Reig Castle, documented in the year 907 and progressively expanded in the 12th and 13th centuries.
St Martin's Church, a Romanesque church from the 12th century with three murals from the 13th century.
The Merola castle, tower remnant of the former Castle in Merola. The castle was first documented in the 12th century, and was a royal possession by the 14th century.

References

External links
 Government data pages 

Municipalities in Berguedà